The Society of American Historians Prize for Historical Fiction, formerly known as the James Fenimore Cooper Prize, is a biennial award given for the best Historical American fiction by the Society of American Historians. It is awarded in the odd-numbered years.

History
The prize has been awarded since 1993. It is given to honor a work of literary fiction that "makes a significant contribution to historical understanding, portrays authentically the people and events of the historical past, and displays skills in narrative construction and prose style" and that concerns American history.

Awards
 1993: Shaman by Noah Gordon
 1995: In the Lake of the Woods by Tim O'Brien
 1997: The Cattle Killing by John Edgar Wideman
 1999: Gain by Richard Powers
 2001: Tie: A Dangerous Friend by Ward Just and Bone by Bone by Peter Matthiessen
 2003: Paradise Alley by Kevin Baker
 2005: The Plot Against America by Philip Roth
 2007: The Last Town on Earth by Thomas Mullen
 2009: Loving Frank by Nancy Horan
 2011: Matterhorn: A Novel of the Vietnam War by Karl Marlantes
 2013: Remember Ben Clayton by Stephen Harrigan
 2015: Saint Monkey by Jacinda Townsend
 2017: No prize awarded
 2019:  There There by Tommy Orange
 2021: Conjure Women by Afia Atakora

References

External links

American literary awards
James Fenimore Cooper